Senator Simon may refer to:

James D. Simon (1897–1982), member of the Louisiana State Senate from 1921 to 1925
Joseph Simon (politician) (1851–1935), U.S. Senator from Oregon from 1898 to 1903; previously served in the Oregon State Senate
Paul Simon (politician) (1928–2003), U.S. Senator from Illinois from 1985 to 1997; previously served in the Illinois State Senate